An Election to Leith Burgh Council was held on 6 November 1894, alongside the municipal elections across Scotland, and the wider British local elections. Contests took place in 3 of the burghs 6 wards, with candidates in the remaining 3 being returned unopposed.

Aggregate results

Ward Results

References

1894 Scottish local elections
November 1894 events
Council elections in Scotland